During the sixteenth and seventeenth centuries, politiques were those in a position of power who put the success and well-being of their state above all else. During the Wars of Religion, this included moderates of both religious faiths (Huguenots and Catholics) who held that only the restoration of a strong monarchy could save France from total collapse, as rulers would often overlook religious differences in order to have a strong country.  References to individuals as politique often had a pejorative connotation of moral or religious indifference.  The concept gained great currency after 1568 with the appearance of the radical Catholic League calling for the eradication of Protestantism in France, and by 1588 the politiques were seen by detractors as an organized group and treated as worse than heretics.

History
In early critical writings, the politiques (largely jurists and intellectuals) were sometimes confused with another group, the "malcontents" (nobles who opposed the political influence of the Guise family). This was mainly because the first record of politiques referred to those Catholics and Huguenots who opposed the founding of a Guise dynasty in France. They rallied against the Guise because King Philip II of Spain openly supported the Duke of Guise.  Because the King of Spain was an enemy of France, many felt uncomfortable with a king hand-picked by the Spanish. Instead, they rallied for peace and unity in France. Many moderate politique Catholics defended the idea of Gallicanism, of making a distinction between the State and Religion, of a unitary and undivided royal sovereignty (against exterior influence or internal divisions), and of privileging national security and peace.

It can be argued that anyone who believed in the necessity of a strong monarchy to national security was a politique.  For example, the politique policies of Henry IV of France, such as the Edict of Nantes (a document granting unprecedented political and religious liberties to the minority French Protestants), directly contributed to the centralized administrative system of seventeenth century France and the absolutism embodied by Louis XIV of France, which included an eventual revocation of the Edict. Another example of a politique was Elizabeth I of England, who was (or claimed to be) a Catholic during the time of her sister Mary I but moved to Protestantism when attaining the throne. The later monarch Charles II - long flirting with Catholicism and holding out a promise to convert to it as a means of getting support from Louis XIV of France, but only actually converting on his deathbed - could also be considered to have acted as a Politique, though by his time the term was less often used. 

Jonathan I. Israel emphasizes the important role played by various "Politiques" in the Dutch Revolt of the 16th Century and the 17th Century Dutch Republic created by that revolt. Specifically, he notes as the most important of them William the Silent, who moved from the Catholic Church to the Calvinist one - the opposite direction to that taken by his contemporary Henry IV of France, but taken out of similar motives. In Jonathan Israel's view, the long-term influence of such Dutch Politiques was positive, helping to mitigate the more intransigent forms of Calvinism and to create in the Netherlands a climate of (relative) religious toleration, greater than in other European countries at the time. Likewise, Blair Worden makes the point that during the Commonwealth of England, while the Lord Protector Oliver Cromwell was broadly Calvinist, his circle contained non-sectarian ‘merciful men’ or politiques who were more tolerant of other doctrines.

Notes

Political history of the Ancien Régime
History of Christianity in France
Religion in the Ancien Régime
French Wars of Religion